Shabby Tiger is a British period television drama series which aired in seven parts on ITV in 1973. It is an adaptation of the 1934 novel of the same title by Howard Spring.

Selected cast
 John Nolan as Nick Faunt (7 episodes) 
 Prunella Gee as Anna Fitzgerald (7 episodes)
 Sharon Maughan as  Rachel Rosing (7 episodes)
 Howard Southern as  Jacob 'Mo' Rosing (7 episodes)
 Alexander Edgar as Brian (7 episodes)
 John Sharp as  Piggy White (5 episodes)
 Rowland Davies as  Anton Brune (5 episodes)
 Patrick Holt as Sir George Faunt (4 episodes)
 Ray Mort as Joe Kepple (4 episodes)
 Christine Hargreaves as  Olga Kepple (4 episodes)
 Sally Grace as Jenny Kepple (2 episodes)
 Peter Dudley as Harry (2 episodes)
 George Malpas as Mr. Carless (1 episode)
 Nigel Havers as Toby Scriven (1 episode)

References

Bibliography
 Howard Maxford. Hammer Complete: The Films, the Personnel, the Company. McFarland, 2018.

External links
 

ITV television dramas
1973 British television series debuts
1973 British television series endings
English-language television shows
Television shows based on British novels